The Stratford Building is a property in Grand Forks, North Dakota that was listed on the National Register of Historic Places in 1982.

It was built in 1913 as a reconstruction of the first, 1902-built Masonic Temple building in Grand Forks, which had burned partially on January 18, 1912.  The reconstruction retained parts of the first floor of the earlier version.

It includes Early Commercial, "Vernacular-Craftsman" and other architecture.

The listing is described in its North Dakota Cultural Resources Survey document.

The property was covered in a 1981 study of Downtown Grand Forks historical resources.

References

Commercial buildings on the National Register of Historic Places in North Dakota
Buildings designated early commercial in the National Register of Historic Places
Commercial buildings completed in 1913
1913 establishments in North Dakota
National Register of Historic Places in Grand Forks, North Dakota
Masonic buildings in North Dakota